The Alpine Botanical Garden of Campo Imperatore (Giardino Botanico Alpino di Campo Imperatore, 3000 m2) is a botanical garden for alpine plants located at Campo Imperatore, L'Aquila, Abruzzo, Italy. It is operated by the University of L'Aquila.

The garden was founded in 1952 by botanist . It collects plants local to the nearby Gran Sasso massif of the Apennine Mountains, including hundreds of grass species, false bilberry, greater gentian, and the Apennine edelweiss.

See also 
 List of botanical gardens in Italy

References 
 
 Breve storia dell'Università 

Botanical gardens in Italy
L'Aquila
Gardens in Abruzzo
1952 establishments in Italy
University of L'Aquila